An internodal segment (or internode) is the portion of a nerve fiber between two Nodes of Ranvier. The neurolemma or primitive sheath is not interrupted at the nodes, but passes over them as a continuous membrane.

References

External links

Neurohistology